Lampoon may refer to:

Parody
Amphol Lampoon (born 1963), Thai actor and singer
The Harvard Lampoon, a noted humor magazine
National Lampoon (magazine), a defunct offshoot of Harvard Lampoon
National Lampoon, Incorporated, a 2002 company

See also
 List of National Lampoon films
 National Lampoon (disambiguation)